Evoke may refer to:

 Evocation, the act of calling upon or summoning a spirit, demon, deity or other supernatural agent 
 E'voke, a British female vocal duo
 Evoke (album), a 2005 electro-industrial album by Wumpscut
 Evoke Motorcycles, a Chinese manufacturer of smart electric motorcycles

See also
 Evoked potential
 Evocation (disambiguation)
 Invoke (disambiguation)